Pavlin Ivanov Todorov  (born 12 October 1983) is a Bulgarian footballer who plays as a forward. Todorov's older brother, Svetoslav, is a former professional footballer and current manager who made a name for himself playing club football for Litex Lovech and in England while also representing his national team.

References

1983 births
Living people
Bulgarian footballers
PFC Kaliakra Kavarna players
PFC Dobrudzha Dobrich players
FC Dunav Ruse players
FC Lyubimets players
First Professional Football League (Bulgaria) players
Second Professional Football League (Bulgaria) players

Association football forwards